Richebourg may refer to:

Places
Richebourg is the name of several communes in France:
 Richebourg, Haute-Marne, in the Haute-Marne department
 Richebourg, Pas-de-Calais, in the Pas-de-Calais department
 Richebourg, Yvelines, in the Yvelines department
 Richebourg-l'Avoué and Richebourg-Saint-Vaast, former communes of the Pas-de-Calais department, now part of Richebourg

Other
 Richebourg (wine), a Grand cru of Vosne-Romanée